Peter Chernin (born May 29, 1951) is an American businessman and investor. He is the chairman and CEO of The Chernin Group (TCG), which he founded in 2010. TCG manages, operates and invests in businesses in the media, entertainment, and technology sectors. Specifically, the company focuses on three areas: making investments in technology and media companies in the US, developing premium content for film and television, and capitalizing on strategic business opportunities in emerging markets.

Early life and education
Chernin was born in Harrison, New York, the son of Mary (née Townsend) and Herbert Chernin. Chernin, whose father was Jewish, was raised Unitarian.  

He attended and graduated with a B.A. in English literature from the University of California, Berkeley.

Career
Chernin joined Fox in 1989 from Lorimar Film Entertainment, where he served as president and chief operating officer. Earlier, he served as executive vice president of programming and marketing for Showtime/The Movie Channel. Prior to Showtime, Chernin was vice president of Development and Production at the David Gerber Company. He began his career in publishing, first as associate publicity director of St. Martin's Press and later as an editor for Warner Books.

News Corp.
Prior to starting TCG, Chernin served as president and chief operating officer of News Corporation and chairman and CEO of the Fox Group from 1996 to 2009. As president and COO of one of the world's largest media companies, he oversaw diversified global operations spanning five continents, including the production and distribution of film and television programming; television, satellite and cable broadcasting and News Corp.'s aggressive expansion into the digital media and internet space.

During his two decades with News Corporation, Chernin gained a reputation as an executive with a unique mastery of both the creative and corporate sides of the entertainment business. He headed both Twentieth Century Fox Filmed Entertainment and, earlier, the Fox Broadcasting Company. He has also had oversight of Fox's tremendous growth in sports, cable and general entertainment television programming and distribution in the U.S. and internationally.

Under Chernin's leadership, Twentieth Century Fox Film Corporation produced the two top-grossing movies of all time, Titanic and Avatar; the Fox Broadcasting Company became the No. 1-ranked network among the key demographic of 18- to 49-year-olds; and Twentieth Century Fox Television, the network production arm of Fox, became the No. 1 supplier of programming to all television networks.

News Corporation's cable network group experienced explosive growth during Chernin's tenure – going from zero to more than 400 million cable subscribers in less than 10 years. By the time Chernin left, Fox had one of the most powerful collections of cable assets in the world: Fox News Channel, FX, Fox Sports Net, Fox Movie Channel, National Geographic Television, SPEED and the Fox Reality Channel. Prior to his 1996 appointment, Chernin served four years as chairman and chief executive officer of Fox Filmed Entertainment where he oversaw all aspects of the studio's worldwide feature-film production, marketing and distribution activities. From 1989 to 1992, Chernin was president of entertainment for the Fox Broadcasting Company, while programming grew from two to all seven nights of the week during that span.

It was rumored in the media that Chernin was going to leave his position at News Corp. by June 2009, when his contract expired, and that he would be replaced in the position by media executive James Murdoch, youngest son of Rupert Murdoch. On February 24, 2009, the Wall Street Journal reported that Peter Chernin made the decision to leave News Corporation after 20 years, to pursue independent entrepreneurial ventures. On June 4, 2009 Chase Carey was named Chernin's successor at his position.

Chernin was approached in October 2010 by the Tribune Company to be either CEO or chairman of the board. There was also media speculation about Chernin's having a role in Yahoo!'s future after Carol Bartz's abrupt departure in September 2011. At the 
All Things Digital's AsiaD Conference
in Hong Kong on October 20, 2011, Chernin dismissed that he was interested in pursuing opportunities with the company.

TCG
Since his departure from News Corp. in 2009, Chernin has been the chairman of his own company, The Chernin Group (TCG). TCG's current assets include Chernin Entertainment, an entertainment production company; a majority stake in CA Media, an Asia-based media investment company; and several strategic investments in U.S. based technology and media companies including Pandora, Fullscreen, Tumblr, Barstool Sports, and Flipboard.

The company's first feature film Rise of the Planet of the Apes, was released in August 2011. and has grossed more than $480 million at the worldwide box office. Chernin Entertainment produced Parental Guidance, a comedy starring Billy Crystal and Bette Midler, which was released in December 2012, the sci-fi thriller from Joseph Kosinski, Oblivion, starring Tom Cruise, and The Heat, starring Melissa McCarthy and Sandra Bullock.

TCG launched CA Media in November 2010, which aims to strategically build, manage, and operate media, entertainment, and technology businesses in Asia. In July 2011, CA Media invested in the Hong Kong-based mixed martial arts promoter Legend Fighting Championship. In April 2012, CA Media acquired a 49 percent stake in Endemol India with the goal of making it the leading TV, film and digital content production company in India. At the same time CA Media also invested in Only Much Louder, a music, live events and youth media company in India. In April 2014, AT&T partnered with The Chernin Group to invest $500 million in online video services.

In April 2012, Chernin sold a minority stake of TCG to strategic investment partners Providence Equity Partners, a leading private equity firm, and other private investors.

In April 2013, Chernin made a bid of around $500 million for Hulu, an online video streaming service. TCG is listed as an investor in Tumblr, which WSJ.com reported on May 19, 2013, would be sold to Yahoo for US$1.1 Billion. On December 2, 2013, TCG announced that they had acquired the anime streaming site Crunchyroll in an effort to expand their online video assets. The acquisition was rumoured to priced at around $100 million. On January 7, 2016, it was announced by David Portnoy in a video that Chernin Media was acquiring a majority stake in the popular website Barstool Sports and moving the headquarters to New York City.

In 2018, Chernin, Jesse Jacobs, and Michael Kerns of The Chernin Group formed TCG Capital Management, an investment advisory firm. TCG manages private equity investments in the media, entertainment, technology, sports and consumer sectors. That same year, Chernin divested its interest of Crunchyroll to AT&T and folded into WarnerMedia division. Crunchyroll was subsequently sold to Funimation in 2021.

In January 2023, Variety (magazine) reported that Peter Chernin's global production studio roll-up company The North Road Co. had received a $150 million investment from Qatar Investment Authority, in addition to an existing $500 million from Providence Equity and $300 million from Apollo Global Management to enable investment in media and technology companies and pursuit of strategic acquisitions.

In February 2023, Reuters reported that Peter Chernin was linked to interest in ITV Studios, the maker of hit show "Love Island".

Boards
Chernin sits on the Boards of American Express, serves as a co-chair of University of California, Berkeley's board of visitors, and is a senior advisor to Providence Equity Partners. He is also chairman and co-founder of Malaria No More and a trustee of Malaria No More UK, non-profits dedicated to ending deaths due to malaria. He previously served on the boards of Twitter, Pandora, News Corp, DirecTV, E-Trade, and Friends of the Global Fight Against AIDS, Tuberculosis and Malaria.

Personal life
Chernin married Megan (née Brody) in 1980.

Politics
Chernin has donated over $100,000 to the Democratic Party, candidates & associated organizations, as well as hosting Barack Obama at his home for a fundraiser in 2013. He also supported Hillary Clinton in the run-up for the 2016 U.S. presidential election.

Filmography 
He was a producer in all films unless otherwise noted.

Film

Thanks

Television

Miscellaneous crew

As an actor

Production manager

References

External links

 
 

1951 births
Living people
20th Century Studios people
American book editors
American book publishers (people)
American chief executives of financial services companies
American businesspeople in the online media industry
American Express people
American financial company founders
American financiers
American people of Jewish descent
American television executives
Barstool Sports people
Businesspeople from New York (state)
Directors of Twitter, Inc.
Film producers from New York (state)
People from Harrison, New York
Presidents of Fox Broadcasting Company Entertainment
Television producers from New York (state)
UC Berkeley College of Letters and Science alumni